Wijaya Dahanayake   is a Sri Lankan politician. He is the current Deputy Minister of Public Administration and Home Affairs in the Sri Lankan government and a member of the Parliament of Sri Lanka from Matara. He is a member of the Sri Lanka Freedom Party.

His father was Sumanapala Dahanayake a Member of Parliament from the Deniyaya electorate (1960–1990). He was educated at Mahinda College, Galle and the Royal College, Colombo. Dahanayake became the SLFP Organizer for the Deniyaya Electorate in Matara District in 1990.

References

Members of the 14th Parliament of Sri Lanka
Sri Lanka Freedom Party politicians
United People's Freedom Alliance politicians
1958 births
Living people
Alumni of Royal College, Colombo
Alumni of Mahinda College
Government ministers of Sri Lanka
Sinhalese politicians